Reuben Chesang (born 22 December 1962) is a Kenyan middle- and long-distance runner, who won the gold medal in the 1500 metres at the 1994 Commonwealth Games in Victoria, British Columbia, Canada.

He now lives and trains in Allen, Texas, having lived in several other locations in the United States. Aged 37 he competed in his first marathon and he has since won the Pittsburgh, Mexico City, Hartford, Connecticut and Richmond, Virginia marathons and in 2012 he was still categorized as an elite athlete for the Boston Marathon.

References

1962 births
Living people
Commonwealth Games gold medallists for Kenya
Athletes (track and field) at the 1994 Commonwealth Games
Kenyan male middle-distance runners
Kenyan male long-distance runners
People from Allen, Texas
Commonwealth Games medallists in athletics
African Games silver medalists for Kenya
African Games medalists in athletics (track and field)
Athletes (track and field) at the 1995 All-Africa Games
20th-century Kenyan people
Medallists at the 1994 Commonwealth Games